The pound was the currency of New Brunswick until 1860. It was divided into 20 shillings, each of 12 pence, with the dollar (initially the Spanish dollar) circulating at a value of 5/– (the Halifax rating).

History
In 1852, New Brunswick adopted the same standard for its pound as the Province of Canada was using, with £1 stg. = £1.4s.4d local currency (see Canadian pound). The pound was replaced by the dollar in 1860, at a rate of 1 dollar = 5 shillings.

Coins
In addition to sterling coin and Spanish dollars, copper tokens were issued in 1834 and 1854 in denominations of d and 1d.

Banknotes
Five chartered banks issued notes, the Bank of Fredericton (1837-1838), the Bank of New Brunswick (1820-1860), the Central Bank of New Brunswick (1847-1860), the Charlotte County Bank (1852-1859) and the Commercial Bank of New Brunswick (1837-1860). Denominations issued were 5/–, 7/– and 10/–, £1, £2, £3, £5, £10 and £25. Some of the Bank of New Brunswick and Central Bank of New Brunswick's notes also bore the denomination in dollars.

See also
 New Brunswick dollar

References

Currencies of Canada
Modern obsolete currencies
Defunct companies of New Brunswick
1860 disestablishments
Economy of New Brunswick